Damián Marcelino Moreno (born 25 June 1994) is an Argentine professional footballer who plays as an attacking midfielder for Brasileiro Série A club Coritiba on loan from Atlanta United.

Club career

Lanús
Moreno had spells with Atlético Palmira and Boca Juniors during his youth career, prior to moving on to join Lanús where he featured at the 2016 U-20 Copa Libertadores. In 2015, Moreno joined Talleres of Torneo Federal A on loan. However, a year later, Moreno rejoined Argentine Primera División side Lanús after not playing for Talleres' first-team. He made his senior debut for Lanús on 19 July 2016 in a Copa Argentina win over San Martín de Formosa, before making his professional league debut against former club Boca Juniors on 28 August. In his debut season of 2016–17, Moreno featured twenty-eight times in all competitions.

Moreno scored his first senior goal in March 2019 against Belgrano.

Atlanta United
On 22 September 2020, following one hundred and twelve appearances and six goals for Lanús, Moreno departed to the United States with Major League Soccer team Atlanta United; signing as a designated player for an undisclosed fee. He debuted in a home defeat to the New York Red Bulls on 11 October, which preceded six further appearances in the 2020 campaign; he also netted penalties in November against FC Cincinnati and Columbus Crew SC.

Coritiba (loan)
On 4 January 2023, Coritiba Foot Ball Club announced they had signed Moreno to a loan for the 2023 season.

Career statistics

Honours
Lanús
Copa Bicentenario: 2016
Supercopa Argentina: 2016

References

External links
 Profile at Major League Soccer

1994 births
Living people
Sportspeople from Mendoza Province
Argentine footballers
Association football forwards
Argentine expatriate footballers
Expatriate soccer players in the United States
Argentine expatriate sportspeople in the United States
Designated Players (MLS)
Torneo Federal A players
Argentine Primera División players
Major League Soccer players
Club Atlético Lanús footballers
Talleres de Córdoba footballers
Atlanta United FC players
Coritiba Foot Ball Club players